Alexander Currie may refer to:
Alexander Monteith Currie (1926–2014), Scottish administrator of the University of Edinburgh
George Alexander Currie (1896–1984), New Zealand scientist and university administrator
Alex Currie (1891–1951), head coach of the Ottawa Senators
Alexander Currie, agricultural labourer